Sadeqabad (also Romanized as Şādeqābād, Sadegh Abad, and Sādīqābād) is a village in Dodangeh-ye Sofla Rural District, Ziaabad District, Takestan County, Qazvin Province, Iran. At the 2006 census, its population was 167, in 47 families.

References 

Populated places in Takestan County